Southaven Towne Center is an open-air regional lifestyle center located in Southaven, Mississippi.  The shopping center is owned and managed by CBL & Associates, who developed the property and opened it in October 2005. It was reported that upon opening, the Southaven Towne Center was expected to contribute 1000 jobs to the local economy. This facility marks a first for CBL & Associates, it is their first foray into the lifestyle center property type. Southaven Towne Center brought department stores to Southaven for the first time.

Anchors
JCPenney
Dillard's

Other Stores
 Sportsman's Warehouse
 Bed Bath & Beyond
 Books-A-Million

Former Stores 
 Linens 'n Things (now Bed Bath & Beyond)
 Circuit City (later hhgregg)
 hhgregg (closed 2017)
 Gordmans (closed 2020)

See also
List of shopping malls in Mississippi

External links
Southaven Towne Center

References

Shopping malls in Mississippi
Southaven, Mississippi
Buildings and structures in DeSoto County, Mississippi
Memphis metropolitan area
CBL Properties
Shopping malls established in 2005